One Championship (styled ONE Championship and formerly One Fighting Championship (ONE FC) until 2014) is a Singaporean combat sports promotion. Founded on 14 July 2011 by entrepreneur Chatri Sityodtong and former ESPN Star Sports senior executive Victor Cui, its events have featured mixed martial arts (MMA), submission grappling, kickboxing, Muay Thai and Lethwei bouts.

The promotion's first event was held on 3 September 2011 at the Singapore Indoor Stadium; they have since gone on to hold over 100 events across Asia. It is Asia's largest MMA promotion company, having been backed by Singapore's GIC and Temasek Holdings, in addition to ICONIQ Capital, Mission Holdings, Sequoia Capital and Greenoaks Capital. In 2020, One was included on Nielsen's list of the world's top 10 biggest sports media properties in terms of viewership and engagement.

History

Founding and early history: 2011–2014

Chatri Sityodtong stated his reasons for founding One Fighting Championship in July 2011 was that he believed that martial arts was Asia's "cultural treasure", yet there was no Pan-Asian promotion to unite the continent. "My vision is to make ONE Asia's first multi-billion-dollar sports media property. Every other region has them[...] But there is absolutely nothing like that on a pan-Asian basis." He chose Singapore as the promotion's base because of its location and communications infrastructure. As a life-long martial artist himself, Sityodtong would later state that the he felt mixed martial arts (MMA) has been "severely tainted by the west", where the physical aspects have been glorified to extremes and "anger, hatred, [and] controversy" are commonplace. Unlike western promotions, ONE's main goal is to promote "values of integrity, humility, honor, respect, courage, discipline, and compassion". Sityodtong says ONE purposely recruits and employs competitors who "are outstanding role models and good human beings with wholesome values", "You don't see any of the trash-talking or any kind of criminal offences or behavior you see in other promotions". Although acknowledging he has respect for those Western promotions, Sityodtong explained, "they approach it in a pure sports manner, whereas as we approach it in Asia as a martial arts approach, just in terms of positioning to the audience and everything else. That's very important".

One Fighting Championship held their first event, ONE FC: Champion vs. Champion, on 3 September 2011 at the sold-out Singapore Indoor Stadium. On 31 March 2012, the promotion held its first female MMA fight during ONE FC: War of the Lions at the same stadium. It saw Nicole Chua, Singapore's first female professional MMA fighter, submit seven time Indian kickboxing champion Jeet Toshi.

On 6 October 2012, One crowned its first two champions at ONE FC: Rise of Kings; Soo Chul Kim became the inaugural ONE Bantamweight World Champion by stopping Leandro Issa, and Kotetsu Boku defeated Zorobabel Moreira by TKO to become the inaugural ONE Lightweight World Champion. The inaugural ONE Featherweight World Championship followed on 3 February 2013 at ONE FC: Return of Warriors, where Honorio Banario defeated Eric Kelly.

After having to be rescheduled from 2013, the inaugural ONE Welterweight World Championship bout took place at ONE FC: War of Nations on 14 March 2014. It saw Nobutatsu Suzuki defeat Brock Larson. At ONE FC: Rise of the Kingdom on 12 September 2014, Adriano Moraes became the first ONE Flyweight World Champion after submitting Geje Eustaquio. The ONE Middleweight World Championship was introduced at ONE FC: Battle of the Lions on 7 November 2014, where Igor Svirid defeated Leandro Ataides in 17 seconds for the title.

Sityodtong revealed that the first three years of ONE FC were a "living hell". He was turned down by many broadcasters, brands, advertisers, and even potential employees who did not understand ONE's vision. They "mistakenly thought it was about fighting and violence", but "people don't watch because of the punch or the kick or the submission. People watch because their heroes are representing their country on the global stage of martial arts."

Name change and expansion: 2015–2019 
On 13 January 2015, the promotion announced it would be changing its name to simply "One Championship". According to then-CEO Victor Cui, the change was made mostly for linguistic and cultural reasons. "I think the reason why I picked the name ONE in the first place was because I wanted a name that transcended the language barrier. If you didn't speak English, you knew what 'one' was[...] It means the top, the best and everybody could say it", but translating the English word "fighting" into dozens of Asian languages and passing it on to partners and sponsors had proven cumbersome.

Dejdamrong Sor Amnuaysirichoke became the first ONE Strawweight World Champion after beating Roy Doliguez on 22 May 2015 at ONE: Warrior's Quest. ONE held the first Lethwei fight in its history at ONE: Kingdom of Warriors on 18 July 2015 in Yangon, Myanmar. The fight showcased Burmese fighters Phyan Thway and Soe Htet Oo in a dark match and the result was a draw according to traditional Lethwei rules. At ONE: Spirit of Champions on 11 December 2015, Brandon Vera knocked out Paul Cheng in the first round to become the inaugural ONE Heavyweight World Champion.

The promotion crowned two more inaugural champions at ONE: Ascent to Power on 6 May 2016. Roger Gracie submitted Michal Pasternak for the inaugural ONE Light Heavyweight World Championship. The inaugural ONE Women's Atomweight World Championship title match saw 19-year-old Angela Lee defeat Mei Yamaguchi to become the first female champion in ONE and one of the youngest ever titleholders in combat sports. On 13 August 2016, ONE Championship held its first grappling tournament in Cotai, Macau; One Grappling Challenge Macao took place before ONE: Heroes of the World. Following International Brazilian Jiu-Jitsu Federation no-gi rules, Angela Lee, Shinya Aoki, and Michelle Nicolini were among the participants.

A "grappling super fight" with submission-only rules was held between Shinya Aoki and Garry Tonon at ONE: Dynasty of Heroes on 26 May 2017. ONE began talks of a partnership with World Lethwei Championship to share athletes to fight in each other's organization. On 30 June 2017, ONE held its second Lethwei match at ONE: Light of a Nation. Thway Thit Win Hlaing defeated Soe Htet Oo by decision according to the WLC point system, where a winner must be chosen by judges decision if the fight goes the distance. Since then, ONE has not held any more Lethwei fights, but Sityodtong has expressed his love for the art and wanting to recruit Dave Leduc into the organization. On 10 November 2017, ONE Featherweight World Champion Martin Nguyen became the promotion's first simultaneous two-division champion when he knocked out Eduard Folayang for the ONE Lightweight World Championship at ONE: Legends of the World.

Xiong Jing Nan defeated Tiffany Teo at ONE: Kings of Courage on 20 January 2018 to win the inaugural ONE Women's Strawweight World Championship. The event also saw another submission-only "grappling super fight", this time between Shinya Aoki and Marat Gafurov. ONE crowned its first champion in Muay Thai at ONE: Unstoppable Dreams on 18 May 2018, when Sam-A Gaiyanghadao stopped Sergio Wielzen for the inaugural ONE Flyweight Muay Thai World Championship. This was followed by ONE's first kickboxing champion at ONE: Battle for the Heavens on 7 July 2018, when the inaugural ONE Atomweight Kickboxing World Championship bout saw Kai Ting Chuang defeat Yodcherry Sityodtong. On 6 October 2018, ONE: Kingdom of Heroes was headlined by Srisaket Sor Rungvisai defending his World Boxing Council championship against Iran Diaz. This is the only boxing match under the ONE Championship banner to date.

ONE Championship and Ultimate Fighting Championship finalized the first "trade" in MMA history on 27 October 2018. ONE Welterweight Champion Ben Askren was released from his contract so he could sign with the UFC and former UFC Flyweight Champion Demetrious Johnson was released from his contract so he could sign with ONE. With distribution of its content to over 150 countries, ONE Championship had become an unlisted company with a value over $1 billion by 2018.

February 2019 saw the inaugural ONE Bantamweight Muay Thai World Championship and ONE Atomweight Muay Thai World Championship matches. The former took place on 16 February 2019 at ONE: Clash of Legends, where Nong-O Gaiyanghadao defeated Han Zihao. The latter took place at ONE: Call to Greatness on 22 February 2019, where ONE Atomweight Kickboxing World Champion Stamp Fairtex defeated Janet Todd to become the promotion's first two-sport champion.

2019 also saw the introduction of multiple ONE championship titles in kickboxing. The inaugural ONE Flyweight Kickboxing World Championship match took place at ONE: Warriors of Light on 10 May 2019, where Petchdam Petchyindee Academy defeated Elias Mahmoudi. The first ONE Lightweight Kickboxing World Championship match took place at ONE: Enter the Dragon 17 May 2019, and saw Regian Eersel defeat Nieky Holzken. Roman Kryklia defeated Tarik Khbabez at ONE: Age of Dragons on 16 November 2019 to become the inaugural ONE Light Heavyweight Kickboxing World Champion. The inaugural ONE Bantamweight Kickboxing World Championship and ONE Strawweight Kickboxing World Championship matches both took place at ONE: Mark of Greatness on 6 December 2019. The bantamweight bout saw Alaverdi Ramazanov defeat Zhang Chenglong by unanimous decision to earn the title, and Sam-A Gaiyanghadao followed suit, winning the strawweight championship by defeating Wang Junguang by unanimous decision.

2020–present
Petchmorakot Petchyindee Academy won the inaugural ONE Featherweight Muay Thai World Championship over Pongsiri P.K.Saenchaimuaythaigym at ONE: Warrior's Code on 7 February 2020. ONE Strawweight Kickboxing World Champion Sam-A Gaiyanghadao became a two-sport champion on 28 February 2020 at ONE: King of the Jungle, where he beat Rocky Ogden for the inaugural ONE Strawweight Muay Thai World Championship.

In May 2021, ONE Championship announced that Gordon Ryan was due to debut in the promotion in a grappling match with Shinya Aoki to be held in August of that year. However, the match never materialized due to the COVID-19 pandemic and Ryan's health issues. Superbon Singha Mawynn became the inaugural ONE Featherweight Kickboxing World Champion by knocking out Giorgio Petrosyan at ONE: First Strike on 15 October 2021.

At ONE: X, an event to celebrate the organization's tenth anniversary, Mei Yamaguchi faced Danielle Kelly and Reinier de Ridder faced André Galvão in a pair of grappling matches on 26 March 2022. 17-year-old Smilla Sundell became the youngest champion in ONE history on 22 April 2022, when she defeated Jackie Buntan at ONE 156 for the inaugural ONE Women's Strawweight Muay Thai World Championship.

In August 2022, ONE Championship announced an anti-doping partnership with International Doping Tests & Management, a subsidiary of Drug Free Sport International, who will independently handle all testing of its fighters for "illegal substances". The partnership began with ONE 160 that month. ONE had previously tested its athletes through World Anti-Doping Agency since 2018. ONE awarded their first belt for submission grappling on 1 October 2022 at ONE on Prime Video 2, where Mikey Musumeci defeated Cleber Souza for the ONE Flyweight Submission Grappling World Championship. ONE Lightweight Kickboxing World Champion Regian Eersel became a two-sport champion when he defeated Sinsamut Klinmee for the inaugural ONE Lightweight Muay Thai World Championship at ONE on Prime Video 3 on 22 October 2022. The same event saw Kade Ruotolo win the inaugural ONE Lightweight Submission Grappling World Championship over Uali Kurzhev.

ONE is set to hold its first event in America, ONE Fight Night 10, at the 1stBank Center in Broomfield, Colorado on 5 May 2023. Colorado was chosen because its athletic commission was the first to approve ONE's rule set. The event is the start of the promotion's expansion into the United States, where it will be opening offices in New York and Los Angeles with the goal of eventually holding 12 events in the country annually. Its parent company is also planning to change its legal domicile to the Cayman Islands.

Rules

Mixed martial arts 
ONE Championship uses the Global Martial Arts Rule Set, which "blends a combination of Best Practices from Asian and Non-Asian Rules". Fighters wear 4-ounce MMA gloves. Matches vary in maximum length, depending on whether it is for a championship title. In all fights, each round can be no longer than five minutes. Most fights have a maximum of three rounds, with one minute breaks in between, but championship matches have a max of five rounds.

Victory is attained by one of the following ways; knockout, submission, verbal tapout, technical knockout or technical submission by referee stoppage, request for stoppage by cornerman, by disqualification, by technical decision, or by judges' decision. Three judges score the bout in its entirety, not round-by-round, utilizing the following criteria in descending order of importance:
 Near knockout or submission
 Damage (internal, accumulated, superficial)
 Striking combinations and cage generalship (ground control, superior positioning)
 Earned takedowns or takedown defense
 Aggression

Illegal targets for strikes are the groin, throat, trachea, and the back of the head, neck or spine. Stomps to the head of a grounded opponent, small joint manipulation, head butting, hair pulling, eye gouging, orifice insertion, spitting, and grabbing onto the cage fence are also illegal. Takedowns must not result in "spiking or pile driver[s] to the head or neck". Soccer kicks to the head of a grounded opponent were previously legal in the competition, initially via an "open attack" rule, which required fighters to get permission from the referee to use them. In September 2012, the company adopted the Pride Fighting Championships' rules on the technique, allowing fighters to use soccer kicks without asking for permission from the referee. Soccer kicks were banned entirely in August 2016 as part of the company's worldwide expansion plans. Sityodtong stated that despite studies showing that soccer kicks are the same as a normal head kick to a standing opponent because you cannot generate any more pivotal force, the technique invites "bad publicity".

Kickboxing and Muay Thai 
ONE Championship uses the Global Kickboxing Rule Set and the Global Muay Thai Rule Set. In kickboxing, fighters wear boxing gloves, with athletes weighing at or below 65.8 kilograms (bantamweight) wearing 8-oz gloves and athletes weighing above wearing 10-oz gloves. In Muay Thai, fighters wear 4-ounce mixed martial arts gloves. Matches vary in maximum length, depending on whether it is for a championship title. In all fights, each round can be no longer than five minutes. Most fights have a maximum of three rounds, with one minute breaks in between, but championship matches have a max of five rounds. ONE Muay Thai allows elbow strikes, clinch fighting, sweeps and throws.

Fights can be won via:
 Knockout, resulting in the opponent being unable to answer the 10-count due to a:
 Punch
 Kick
 Knee
 Elbow (only in Muay Thai rules)
 Legal throw (only in Muay Thai rules)
 Technical knockout due to:
 Four knockdowns in a bout
 Three knockdowns in a round
 Referee/doctor stoppage
 Verbal retirement by the opponent
 Decision
 Unanimous decision (all three judges score in favor of one fighter)
 Split decision (two judges score in favor of one fighter, one judge scores in favor of the other fighter)
 Majority decision (two judges score in favor of one fighter, one judge scores a draw)
 Technical decision
 Disqualification

Fights are scored round-by-round by three judges using the 10-point must system. If the points tally is equal, then the judges utilize the "ONE Judging Criteria" to determine a winner:
 Knockdowns
 Damage (internal, accumulated, and superficial)
 Number of clean strikes
 Aggression and cage/ring generalship (superior positioning)

Submission grappling  
ONE utilizes the Global Submission Grappling Rule Set. Matches consist of a single 10 minute round. Victory can be obtained by submission, verbal tapout, referee stoppage "due to imminent danger", request for stoppage by cornerman, or by judges' decision. Three judges score the bout by the number of catches, or "legitimate" submission attempts. If there are an equal number of catches, the grappler who was awarded the last catch will be named the winner. If there are no catches, the judges will award victory to the athlete who showed more aggression. Yellow cards are issued to grapplers who stall. Once an athlete is issued a yellow card, the only way that athlete can win is by submission. Prior to May 20, 2022, submission grappling matches could only be won via submission and were automatically declared a draw after a 12 minute time limit.

Weight divisions 
ONE Championship currently uses ten different weight classes:

Unlike most MMA organizations, these weight limits are based on a competitor's "walking weight", rather than pre-fight weigh-ins.

The change took place after the death of 21-year-old Chinese fighter, Yang Jian Bing (who was supposed to face Geje Eustaquio) on 11 December 2015, due to dehydration by weight-cutting in the Philippines.

The promotion banned weight-cutting by dehydration in order to promote fighter safety. The promotion’s revised policy on weight mandated that athletes are monitored in their training camps, and have urine specific gravity tests to ensure they are hydrated up to three hours ahead of their bouts. Since the new measures took effect, there have been no further serious incidents.

The new system was well received by athletes in the organization, as well as other stakeholders in the MMA industry.

Events

Category: -  2011 in ONE Championship  -  2012 in ONE Championship  -  2013 in ONE Championship  -  2014 in ONE Championship  -  2015 in ONE Championship  -  2016 in ONE Championship  -  2017 in ONE Championship  -  2018 in ONE Championship  -  2019 in ONE Championship  -  2020 in ONE Championship - 2021 in ONE Championship - 2022 in ONE Championship
- 2023 in ONE Championship  (upcoming)

ONE Warrior Series
In November 2017, it was announced that ONE VP Rich Franklin would head up a competition called the ONE Warrior Series, searching for up-and-coming martial artists in Asia. The prize is a six-figure contract with the organization, with the winner determined based on their performance instead of victories.

ONE Super Series
On February 12, 2018, ONE Championship announced the establishment of the ONE Super Series, which would feature kickboxing and Muay Thai bouts. The first event that featured bouts under Muay Thai and kickboxing rules was ONE: Heroes of Honor in Manila on 20 April 2018. The promotion signed notable names such as Giorgio Petrosyan, Nong-O Gaiyanghadao and Fabio Pinca to feature on the bill. Since the inception of ONE Super Series, some events have used a five-roped ring, instead of the ONE circular cage, which had been used exclusively up until 2018. The ONE Super Series kickboxing bouts adopt the oriental ruleset. As of 2020, ONE Super Series kickboxing bouts use boxing gloves. In ONE Super Series Muay Thai bouts, open-finger 4 oz gloves are used. The first ONE event to consist entirely of ONE Super Series contests was ONE Championship: Immortal Triumph in Ho Chi Minh City on 6 September 2019.

ONE Infinity
On 13 February 2020, ONE announced the launch of the "Infinity" series, events consisting of at least three championship fights and a minimum of 12 world champions.

ONE Lumpinee
In September 2022, ONE announced a partnership with the Royal Thai Army to hold at least 52 shows in 2023 at the Lumpinee Stadium in Bangkok, Thailand. The weekly events started with ONE Friday Fights 1 on 20 January 2023, where Nong-O Gaiyanghadao successfully defended his bantamweight Muay Thai title with a TKO of Alaverdi Ramazanov in the third round. The event finished as the most-watched show in prime time in Thailand, with a 3.9 rating among males 15 years old and over, according to data collected by Nielsen. It was broadcast locally on Thailand's Channel 7. The event predominately features Muay Thai, but also includes MMA, kickboxing, and submission grappling bouts. They are broadcast live in 154 countries, and reportedly offer the highest purses in Muay Thai history.

Executive and production team
ONE Championship is operated by Group ONE Holdings, whose leadership and executive team are chairman and chief executive officer Chatri Sityodtong, vice chairman Saurabh Mittal, group president Hua Fung Teh, and chief financial officer Jesley Chua. Matches are made by matchmaker and Vice President of Operations, Matt Hume. In May 2014, former UFC Middleweight Champion Rich Franklin became a vice president of ONE Championship. The referees include Olivier Coste, Mohamad Sulaiman, Yuji Shimada, Kemp Cheng and Justin Brown for MMA matches, and Atsushi Onari and Elias Dolaptsis for ONE Super Series matches. The regular colour commentators for the English-language television broadcasts are Michael Schiavello and Mitch Chilson, although Josh Thomson, Jason Chambers, Bas Rutten and Renzo Gracie have appeared as guest commentators.

ONE co-founder Victor Cui was CEO International until leaving the organization in early 2022 to become president and CEO of the Edmonton Elks. Former Strikeforce and UFC Women's Bantamweight Champion Miesha Tate was a vice president of ONE from 2018 until 2021, when she returned to active competition as a fighter.

Roster 

In May 2022, Sityodtong stated ONE Championship had 600 fighters in the organization.

Fighter salary
Fighter salaries in Asia are not publicly disclosed, unlike in the US, so information about ONE FC's fighter purses is not in the public domain. However, in January 2014 Ben Askren revealed that he was being paid a minimum of US$50,000 per fight as well as a US$50,000 win bonus.

A cash bonus known as the "ONE Warrior bonus" was introduced on 9 July 2014 and implemented for the first time at ONE Fighting Championship: War of Dragons on 11 July 2014.

An award of US$50,000 is given out at the end of certain events to the fighter who impresses the most in terms of:

 thrilling the fans with exciting action;
 demonstrating an incredible warrior spirit;
 exhibiting amazing skill, and;
 delivering a phenomenal finish.

Victor Cui stated that bonuses would be handed out on a discretionary basis: "For every event, the bar will be very, very high. If a few fighters impress me, then I will hand out the bonus to a few fighters. If no one impresses me, then no one will get it. Extraordinary performance deserves extraordinary rewards. Ordinary performances deserve ordinary rewards."

The "ONE Warrior bonus" of $50,000 was re-introduced in January 2022, with a minimum of one bonus and a maximum of five bonuses awarded at each event.

Rankings

The rankings for ONE Championship's fighters are both recorded and updated when information has been obtained from the promotion's official website.

Current champions

Tournament winners 
ONE Grand Prix Champions

Malaysia GP Champions

Cambodia GP Champions

China GP Champions

Myanmar GP Champions

ONE Championship records

Cross-promotional partnerships
In 2017, ONE entered into a partnership with World Lethwei Championship parties agreed on sending athletes to fight in each other's organization.

In January 2019, ONE entered into a partnership with Shooto, according to which Shooto champions would be given a contract with ONE Championship.

They entered into a similar partnership with Indonesian promotion One Pride MMA in December 2020.

On February 18, 2021, ONE partnered with American promotion Ringside United Fighting (RUF Nation). The partnership saw RUF hosting a Road to ONE 16-man heavyweight MMA tournament, with the winner getting a $100,000 contract to compete in ONE Championship. 

On May 6, 2022, ONE partnered with Thailand-based Fairtex Fight Promotion. Fairtex Fight Promotion would begin hosting a series of Road to ONE Muay Thai tournaments for three different weight classes in July, offering a $100,000 contract to compete in ONE Championship.  

On May 27, 2022, ONE announced a partnership with UK-based Muay Thai Grand Prix. The partnership would see MTGP hosting Road to ONE tournaments in two different weight classes, with the winners receiving a ONE Championship contract worth $100,000.

Broadcasters 
It has been broadcast by RCTI (2015–2017), GTV (2012, repeat only for 2020–2021), iNews (2015–2017, repeat only for 2020–present), Moji (repeat only for 2022–present), Indosiar (delayed in 2013–2014), SCTV (delayed in 2018–2022), Vidio (live in 2018–2022), Netverse (live in 2022–present), NET. (delayed in 2022–present) and BTV (repeat only for 2022–present) in Indonesia, MediaCorp Channel 5 (temporarily) in Singapore, ABS-CBN S+A/TV5/One Sports/LIGA Channel in the Philippines, MyTV in Cambodia, Astro Arena, TV9 and RTM in Malaysia, Workpoint TV, Thairath TV (2016–2022) and Channel 7 (2023–present) in Thailand, TV Tokyo and AbemaTV in Japan.

On 30 January 2012, they signed a 10-year deal with ESPN Star Sports. ONE made its PPV debut at ONE Fighting Championship: Rise of Kings via iN DEMAND, Avail-TVN, DirecTV and Dish.

Since May 2018, ONE events have been broadcast live and free on both their dedicated apps and YouTube channel in select locations.

On 11 December 2018, ONE announced a three-year broadcast deal with Turner Sports in the United States that will bring live events to streaming service B/R Live and recap shows on TNT.

On 23 March 2019 ONE announced it had signed a multi-year deal with Star Sports in India. On 19 September 2019, it was announced that sports streaming service FITE TV would broadcast the promotion's two-part, 100th numbered event, Century.

In November 2020, ONE announced a partnership with Facebook to distribute ONE Championship content on Facebook Watch and IGTV.

On April 27, 2022, ONE announced a five-year distribution deal with Amazon Prime Video, giving Amazon Prime exclusive broadcast rights for at least 12 live events annually during prime time hours in the United States and Canada.

On September 29, 2022, ONE announced an exclusive multi-year partnership with beIN Sports to broadcast live ONE Championship events across the Middle East and North Africa for the first time. In addition to events, the partnership is set to include round-up shows, as well as related social media and digital content. beIN Sports will broadcast ONE's events to 24 MENA territories with both English and Arabic commentary.

On December 8, 2022, ONE announced the partnership with Tero Entertainment during the press conference for broadcast One Lumpinee (internationally known as ONE Friday Fights) from Lumpinee Stadium, Bangkok via Thailand's Channel 7 to more than 154 countries every Friday evening starting January 20, 2023. This broadcast has been considered a big turn in the Thai television industry because Channel 7 had to remove the television drama on the prime time time-slot after the evening news, which was considered a regular identity and main income resources of the channel since its establishment in 1967.

On March 16, 2023, ONE has announce to partnered with Seven Network to aired both ONE Fight Night (which been aired on Prime Video in United States & Canada) and ONE Friday Fights exclusively for 7plus in Australia.

See also
Bellator MMA
Brave Combat Federation 
Glory 
K-1
Rizin Fighting Federation 
Thai Fight
Ultimate Fighting Championship

Notes

References

External links 

 
 List of ONE events on Sherdog

 
2011 establishments in Singapore
Mixed martial arts in Singapore
Kickboxing in Singapore 
Sports organisations of Singapore
Mixed martial arts organizations
Sports organizations established in 2011
Kickboxing organizations
Boxing organizations
Professional Muay Thai organizations